Marko Drobnjak (born 17 May 1995) is a Serbian professional footballer who plays as a goalkeeper for Sevan FC.

Club career

Borac Čačak
Born in Čačak, Drobnjak started playing football with local club Borac at the age of 8, and later passed the whole youth school of the same club until 2013 when he joined the first team as a third choice goalkeeper. He also stayed with youth team until 2014, and after he overgrown that level he definitely joined the first team. He also signed his first, four-and-a-half year professional contract with his home club on 5 February 2014. After the first half-season he spent as a third choice behind captain a Nikola Petrić and Vladimir Bajić, Drobnjak was mostly used as a back-up option for Bajić during the spring, but he was also loaned to Polet Ljubić on dual registration eventually. He made his SuperLiga debut for Borac Čačak in 20 fixture of the 2014–15 season in away match against OFK Beograd, played on 21 March 2015, replacing injured Vladimir Bajić in 67 minute. At the beginning of 2016, Drobnjak moved on loan to Polet Ljubić until the end of 2015–16 season. After the end of same season, he was nominated for the most prospective goalkeeper in his home town. He started the 2016–17 season with the first team of Borac Čačak, but after Branimir Aleksić joined the club, Drobnjak left on six-month loan to Radnički Kragujevac. In summer 2017 Drobnjak returned to his home club and started new season under Igor Spasić, but later mutually terminated the contract and moved to Polet Ljubić as a single player.

Železiarne Podbrezová
Ending of November 2017, Drobnjak signed two-and-a-half year contract with the Slovak Super Liga side Železiarne Podbrezová. He was ordered number 1 jersey and was usually used as a back-up for Martin Kuciak in early 2018. Drobnjak has also played with Podbrezová reserves in the Slovakian second tier. Drobnjak made his official debut in the Slovakian top level league in 1–0 away defeat against Zemplín Michalovce on 12 May 2018.

FK Jošanica
In August 2019, FK Jošanica announced on Facebook, that Drobnjak had joined the club.

Sevan FC
On 27 June 2021, Drobnjak signed with Sevan FC.

International career
After he was a member of Serbia U19 national team level between 2013 and 2014, Drobnjak was also called in U20 squad under coach Veljko Paunović in 2014.

Career statistics

Club

References

External links
 
 
 
 
 

1995 births
Living people
Sportspeople from Čačak
Association football goalkeepers
Serbian footballers
Serbian expatriate footballers
Serbia youth international footballers
FK Borac Čačak players
FK Polet Ljubić players
FK Radnički 1923 players
FK Železiarne Podbrezová players
FK Zlatibor Čajetina players
FK Novi Pazar players
Serbian SuperLiga players
Slovak Super Liga players
Serbian expatriate sportspeople in Slovakia
Expatriate footballers in Slovakia